Tommi Korpela (born 23 August 1968) is a Finnish actor. He has won the Jussi Award for Best Actor all together three times - a feat that has been accomplished by only two Finnish actors before him: Lasse Pöysti and Tauno Palo.

Filmography

References

External links 

1968 births
Living people
Male actors from Helsinki